Datia railway station is a railway station in Datia district, Madhya Pradesh. Its code is DAA. It serves Datia town. It is located on Gwalior-Jhansi mainline section.The station consists of three platforms. It lacks many facilities including water and sanitation. Passenger, MEMU, Express, and Superfast trains halt here.

Trains

The following trains halt at Datia railway station in both directions:

 Malwa Express
 Mumbai CST Amritsar Express
 Jabalpur–H.Nizamuddin Express
 Mahakoshal Express
 Dakshin Express
 Jhansi–Bandra Terminus Express
 Kalinga Utkal Express
 Bundelkhand Express
 Hirakud Express
 Chambal Express
 Howrah–Mathura Chambal Express
 Punjab Mail
 Chhattisgarh Express
 Barauni–Gwalior Mail
 Taj Express
 Khajuraho–Udaipur City Express
 Jhelum Express

References

Railway stations in Datia district
Jhansi railway division